The 1927 Wesley Wildcats football team represented Wesley Collegiate Institute (later known as Wesley College) in the 1927 college football season as an independent. Led by coach Josh S. Faulkner his second year, the Wildcats compiled a 6–1 record.

Schedule

References

Wesley
Wesley Wolverines football seasons
Wesley Wildcats football